Flêtre (from ) is a commune in the Nord department in northern France.

Bertenacre Military Cemetery, a British military cemetery with casualties from both world wars, is located three kilometers north of Flêtre.

Heraldry

See also
Communes of the Nord department

References

Communes of Nord (French department)
French Flanders